Kevin Fulbright Warren (born November 17, 1963) is an American attorney and sports executive. He is the team president and chief executive officer (CEO) of the Chicago Bears of the National Football League (NFL - the major professional league for American football) . He was previously the commissioner of the Big Ten Conference -- the first Commissioner who is African-American, he was also the first in any of the major American student-sports conferences in history.  

In 2015, Warren became the first African-American chief operating officer (COO) of an NFL team,and during the time he worked for the Minnesota Vikings was the highest-ranking African-American executive working on the business side for an NFL team. 

Warren played basketball in college, then attended graduate business school and law school, beginning his career in law, sports agency, and player career management.  He began his NFL front office career with the St. Louis Rams in 1997.

Early years
Warren was born in Phoenix on November 17, 1963.  He became interested in sports at an early age, which he attributes to members of his family. His father, the late Dr. Morrison Warren, Sr., played professional football for the Brooklyn Dodgers in 1948, and went on to be named President of the 1982 Fiesta Bowl Board of Directors, the first African-American to serve in this position for a major college bowl game. In 2013, Arizona State University (ASU) named Warren as one of the Top 50 ASU football players of all time.  His eldest brother, Morrison Warren, Jr., played football at Stanford in the early 1960s, and was one of the first African-American scholarship student-athletes at Stanford.

As a young boy, Kevin was struck by a car and forced into traction and a body cast for many months. Doctors informed Warren that there was a chance he might not walk again, and therefore it was highly unlikely that he would ever fulfill any dreams he had of playing sports. A doctor told Kevin that aquatic rehabilitation exercises may be his only hope at recovery. Since there was not an easily accessible pool in Kevin's neighborhood, Kevin's family used the money from the insurance settlement received following the car accident to construct a pool in his backyard. Aided by his dedication to swimming, Warren recovered and went on to be recruited to play college basketball.

Education
After graduating high school, Warren entered the University of Pennsylvania in Philadelphia. The following year, he left Penn to attend Grand Canyon University, a Christian university in Arizona where he earned his undergraduate degree in Business Administration in 1986.

Following his graduation from Grand Canyon University, Warren attended Arizona State University where he earned his Master of Business Administration in 1988. He subsequently attended the University of Notre Dame Law School, where he earned his Juris Doctor in 1990. In November 2019, Warren was inducted into the 42nd annual W.P. Carey School of Business Alumni Hall of Fame at Arizona State University.

College basketball
Warren began his college basketball playing days at the University of Pennsylvania, where he was a member of the Quakers’ 1981-82 Ivy League Championship team before playing for two years at GCU. At GCU, Warren scored 1,118 points and averaged 20.0 points per game, the fourth-best career scoring average in the school's history. In Warren's senior season of 1985-86, he averaged 23.3 points per game, which also ranks as the fourth-best season average in GCU basketball history. On November 17, 1984, Warren posted a 42-point performance against Concordia College. That performance is the fourth-highest single game scoring total in school history.

Warren earned GTE/CoSida Second Team Academic All-America honors as a senior, and added NAIA Academic All-America & NAIA District 7 Basketball Team honors as both a junior and senior. He posted a cumulative 3.49 GPA while at GCU. In March, 2012, Warren was honored as the 16th individual, and the 5th member from the University's basketball team, to be inducted into the Grand Canyon University Athletics Hall of Fame.

Bar membership 
Warren is licensed to practice law with the State Bars of Kansas and Michigan, and in Washington, D.C.

Career

Bond, Schoeneck & King, PLLC. (1990–1991)
Warren began his law career at Bond, Schoeneck & King in Overland Park, Kansas (1990–91).  As an associate there, he received his first exposure to sports law.  The firm specialized in representing universities that were charged with NCAA violations. While at the firm, Warren worked with former Southeastern Conference Commissioner, Michael Slive, and collegiate sports attorney Mike Glazier on many high-profile cases.

Kevin F. Warren & Associates (1992–1997)
In 1991, while teaching a class at Notre Dame, Warren befriended All-American defensive lineman Chris Zorich.  In 1992, Warren established his own sports and entertainment agency, Kevin Warren & Associates in Overland Park, Kansas, with Zorich becoming his first client. Warren also represented Hall of Fame Kansas City Chiefs offensive lineman Will Shields.  During his time in Kansas City, Warren also served as an adjunct professor at the University of Missouri-Kansas City School of Law.

St. Louis Rams (1997–2001)
In 1997, Warren was hired by then St. Louis Rams head coach Dick Vermeil in a legal/front office position. Kevin Warren held the position of Vice President of Player Programs/Football Legal Counsel for the St. Louis Rams from 1997 to 2000 before his promotion to Vice President of Football Administration.  Working closely with Vermeil, Warren gained insight into how football operations functioned. Warren credits this experience for providing him with priceless knowledge and credits Coach Vermeil for providing him his big break into the NFL. Warren earned a Super Bowl Ring with the Rams when they defeated the Tennessee Titans in Super Bowl XXXIV. Vermeil praised Warren in 2012 as being "as critical and important a part of [the] Rams Super Bowl Championship team as anybody in [the] organization."

Detroit Lions (2001–2003)
In 2001, Warren joined the Detroit Lions as the Senior Vice President of Business Operations & General Counsel. During his stint with the Lions, Warren was recognized by Crain's Detroit Business on their “40 Under 40” list, which honored the top 40 Detroit business leaders under the age of 40.

Greenberg Traurig (2003–2005)
Following his time with the Lions, Warren returned to Phoenix where he worked for the international law firm Greenberg Traurig.  In this role Warren represented the Wilf family and Minnesota Vikings ownership group in what became a successful $600 million deal to purchase the Minnesota Vikings. Zygi Wilf and five partners purchased the Minnesota Vikings from Red McCombs in 2005. Forbes estimated the 2019 value of the franchise at 2.7 billion.

Minnesota Vikings (2005–2019)
Warren represented the Vikings’ new ownership group in their purchase of the team. The Vikings then hired Warren as their Executive Vice President of Legal Affairs and Chief Administrative Officer in 2005.  In 2007, NFL Commissioner, Roger Goodell appointed Warren to the NFL's working group on emergency planning. In September 2013, Warren was named a member of the NFL Committee on Workplace Diversity, which works to enhance and promote diversity at every level of the NFL.

In February 2015, Warren was promoted to the role of Chief Operating Officer. As COO, he oversaw all aspects of the business operations of the franchise. He restructured the management of the organization, which included creating new senior leadership positions, overseeing administration and finance, human resources, legal, marketing and fan engagement, and sales and corporate sponsorships. Warren also served as a member of the Vikings’ internal stadium development team and represented the team at NFL meetings.

As COO of the Minnesota Vikings, Warren oversaw the team's long-running quest for a new stadium, to be named U.S. Bank Stadium, the largest public/private construction project in Minnesota's history.  Warren was instrumental in selecting designers, developers, legal advisors and the Vikings' interim location for play, TCF Bank Stadium,  while their new $1.13 billion stadium was under construction.  The Vikings began the 2016 NFL season in the new venue.  Even before construction was completed, U.S. Bank Stadium was awarded Super Bowl LII.

Warren was also responsible for overseeing construction of the Vikings' new practice facility in Eagan, Twin Cities Orthopedic Performance Center, which opened in March 2018.  The ribbon-cutting ceremony was held in June 2018 with attendees including NFL Commissioner Roger Goodell, Twin Cities Orthopedics CEO Troy Simonson, and Governor Mark Dayton. He was also responsible for negotiating the naming rights of the state-of-the art facility. The facility spans 40-acres and includes administrative offices for Vikings staff; a 6,000 person capacity outdoor stadium; five outdoor practice fields; an indoor practice facility; a media center; expanded locker room, weight room, & equipment facilities; cardiovascular and specialized speed rooms; a hydrotherapy room; and post-workout recovery rooms. The facility is only the first phase in a planned 200-acre development which is expected to include offices, retail, residential, hospitality, and a conference center. The Vikings’ headquarters will be the development's anchor.

Big Ten Commissioner (2019–2023)

Kevin Warren was named Commissioner of the Big Ten Conference on June 4, 2019. Warren follows Jim Delany as the 6th Big Ten commissioner. Warren is the first African-American leader of the Big Ten and also the first African American leader of any of the Power Five conferences. He assumed Big Ten Commissioner-Elect duties in September, 2019 and assumed the position of Commissioner in January, 2020. Under Warren's oversight, the Big Ten persevered through the Covid-19 pandemic and he expanded the conference with the future additions of USC and UCLA joining in 2024.

Chicago Bears (2023–present)

On January 12, 2023, Warren was named the new team president and chief executive officer of the Chicago Bears.

Awards 
Warren has won the Fritz Pollard Alliance Salute to Excellence Award following 4 different NFL seasons. The Twin Cities Business Journal recognized Warren as a Minority Business Leader in 2006 and honored him with the Corporate Counsel Award for Private Company-Large in 2015. In 2017, on the eve of Super Bowl LI, Warren was presented with the inaugural Texas Southern University Pioneer Award. In 2019, Warren received GENYOUth's Vanguard award presented by NFL Commissioner Roger Goodell and GENYOUth Founder Alexis Glick. Warren also received the Trailblazer Award at the Minnesota Sports Awards for his work with the Minnesota Vikings and his upcoming role as Big Ten commissioner. In December 2019, Warren was featured on the cover of Sports Business Journal alongside Serena Williams, LeBron James, and Adam Silver where he received the honor of "Best Hire" of the year.

Board and committee memberships
His professional associations include: serving as a member of the Board of Directors of Grand Canyon Education, Inc. and the Board of Trustees of Blue Cross Blue Shield Minnesota. He is also member of the Notre Dame Law School Advisory Council. In March 2016, Warren was appointed by University of Minnesota President Eric W. Kaler to serve as a member of the selection committee for the role of Athletic Director. His civic roles include being on the General Board of the YMCA of the Twin Cities; the Board of Directors for the Page Education Foundation; the University of Minnesota's Medical Foundation Board of Directors, and U of M's Medicine and Health Board of Overseers. Warren is a life member of the Fiesta Bowl Board of Directors. In addition, Warren is a member of the 2016-2017 Board of Trustees for the Minneapolis Institute of Art. Warren previously served as a board member on the board of directors of Securian Financial Group.

Philanthropy
In 2014, Warren and his wife Greta created Carolyn's Comforts, in conjunction with the University of Minnesota Children's Hospital, donating $1 million to honor the legacy of his sister Carolyn Elaine Warren-Knox who died of brain cancer in October 2014. Since the inception of Carolyn's Comforts, over 150 financial grants have been made to families in need.

Warren and his wife Greta have also "adopted" Lucy Craft Laney Community School in Minneapolis, Minnesota. For each of the past 5 years, the Warrens have donated thousands of backpacks filled with school supplies to the student body. Among the resources they have contributed are school supplies, school uniforms, and athletic uniforms.

Personal
Kevin Warren and his wife Greta were married in 1992. Greta holds a bachelor's degree from Kansas State University.  Together, the couple have a daughter, Peri, and a son, Powers. Powers  is a tight end at Michigan State, transferring from Mississippi State following his graduation and receiving his degree.   He also attended IMG Academy. The family resides in the greater Chicago area.

References

1963 births
Living people
Big Ten Conference commissioners
Grand Canyon University alumni
Chicago Bears executives
Minnesota Vikings executives
National Football League executives
Notre Dame Law School alumni
People from Tempe, Arizona